Kipling GO Station is a GO Transit railway station along the Milton line rail corridor in Toronto, Ontario, Canada. It is located at 27 St. Albans Road in the Islington-City Centre West neighbourhood of Toronto (formerly Etobicoke), near Dundas Street. It is connected to the Toronto subway's Kipling station on Line 2 Bloor–Danforth, along with other Toronto Transit Commission and MiWay (Mississauga's municipal bus service) and GO Transit bus services.

A pair of tracks serve the station, with a single island platform between them, but GO trains generally use the south tracks. This station is on a Canadian Pacific Railway rail corridor.

This station has two entrances; the original station building at the east end of the platform containing a ticket sales agent, which is linked to the TTC station by stairs; and as of 2021, the Kipling Transit hub on the west end, with a pedestrian bridge and bus terminal for both GO and MiWay buses. It is one of four GO stations connected directly to a TTC subway station (others being Downsview Park, Kennedy and Union). The station has no parking facilities of its own (the nearby car park is operated by the TTC).

Kipling has been wheelchair-accessible since 2005, and both entrances have elevators. It has a platform long enough for a full-length GO train of twelve Bombardier BiLevel carriages and a locomotive.

References

External links

Transport in Etobicoke
GO Transit railway stations
Galt Subdivision
Railway stations in Toronto
Railway stations in Canada opened in 1981
1981 establishments in Ontario
MiWay